Cosmoceroidea is a nematode super family in the order Ascaridida.

References

Bibliography 
Anderson, R.M. (2000): Nematode Parasites of Vertebrates: Their Development and Transmission, 2nd Edition. New York, USA, CABI Publishing.

External links 

Rhabditia
Animal superfamilies